Robert Andrew Long (born June 16, 1941) is a former American football wide receiver in the National Football League who played in the 1960s and 1970s and earned two Super Bowl rings. He attended suburban Pittsburgh's  Washington Township High School (near Apollo), and Wichita State University. His seven-year pro-career was spent with the Green Bay Packers and the Washington Redskins. He was a contributing player of both of Vince Lombardi's teams which won Super Bowl I and Super Bowl II. Long was inducted into the State of Kansas Hall of Fame in 1965 and the Wichita State Hall of Fame in 1972. Recently, in 2008 he was added to the Western Chapter of Pennsylvania Sports Hall of Fame.

After being a Third-team All American at Wichita State University, Bob was drafted in the fourth round by the Green Bay Packers in 1964. He played on the Green Bay teams that won the NFL Championship in 1965, and won the first two Super Bowls in 1966 and 1967. That Packers team is the only team in NFL history to win three championships in a row.

After joining the Atlanta Falcons in 1968, Long reunited with Lombardi in 1969 with the Washington Redskins. He spent his final season with the Los Angeles Rams in 1970. Bob also was Doing Active National Guardsman Duty as a Corporal during the 1969 Season.

Long, along with Tom Brown, played for both the Green Bay Packers and Washington Redskins under Vince Lombardi and are part of the "Lombardi Legend."

He has been very active in charity events in the state of Wisconsin. He served as President of NFLPA Retirees for Wisconsin. He has raised over $1,500,000 for various charities with the Long Journey to the Super Bowl Raffle. He has worked tirelessly for the Ray Nitschke Foundation, Special Olympics, Task Force Against Family violence and Alzheimers. He also brought the first Pizza Hut to northern Wisconsin from 1968 to 1979.

References

1942 births
Living people
Sportspeople from McKeesport, Pennsylvania
American football wide receivers
Players of American football from Pennsylvania
Wichita State Shockers football players
Green Bay Packers players
Atlanta Falcons players
Washington Redskins players
Los Angeles Rams players
Basketball players from Pennsylvania
American men's basketball players
Wichita State Shockers men's basketball players